The Tears of Artamon is a series of  three fantasy novels by  the English author  Sarah Ash (sister of Jessica Rydill). The three books are Lord of Snow and Shadows (2003), Prisoner of the Iron Tower (2004), and Children of the Serpent Gate (2005). They are published by Bantam Press in the United Kingdom and Bantam Spectra in the United States. The series follows the protagonist Gavril Andar, later Gavril Nagarian under his father’s name, from his humble beginnings as a portraitist from Smarna through to becoming the High Steward of Azhkendir.

Overview
Background Information
Artamon was the former emperor of Rossiya, a kingdom that comprised Tielen, Smarna, Muscobar, Azhkendir and Khitari.  Artamon’s sons fought vehemently between themselves over land and title and once possessed by Drakhaouls they tore the empire apart.  A grand ruby of their father was broken into pieces and each son took one each, these became referred to as the Tears of Artamon.  Four out of five of the Drakhaouls were driven back and banished from the mortal realm by Saint Sergius, however the final Drakhaoul, Khezef, defeated and killed Sergius.  Khezef continued to dwell among mortals by inhabiting the ruling monarch of Azhkendir, through the generations.  The remainder of Artamon’s descendants spread out across the fragmented empire and over time all knowledge of the Drakhaouls was forgotten.

Synopsis
Gavril Andar who has a surprisingly vivid dream, and is subsequently kidnapped from his home in Smarna, where he resided with his mother, Elysia.  He is taken to Azhkendir and informed that he is the son of the recently deceased Lord Volkh Nagarian and that he is to assume power as his father’s heir.  Gavril soon comes to understand that his father’s Drakhaoul, Khezef, had sought him out and possessed him as the rightful inheritor and one of Artamon’s descendants.

During the course of this first instalment in the trilogy, Gavril must learn to adjust to the new culture and environment he has so suddenly found himself enveloped in, and come to terms with his birthrights.  While battling with his unwanted Drakhoul in his father’s Kastel he forms a fondness toward one of the young maids, Kiukiu, a girl who falls in love with Gavril.  Despite endeavouring to discover methods of banishing his Drakhaoul, Gavril embraces him in a battle against an advancing army, under the leadership of Eugene of Tielen, in order to save his Kastel and its inhabitants.  Meanwhile, Kiukiu has uncovered her true heritage as a Spirit Singer after she unexpectedly met her (previously unknown to her) grandmother, Malusha.  At the climax of the book, Gavril persuades Malusha to help him exorcise Khezef, which he achieves at a terrible cost to himself and those around him.

Prisoner of the Iron Tower expands the wealth of characters; following the lives of many key figures this instalment successfully threads together various elements to create the wider story.  At the onset of 'Prisoner of the Iron Tower,' Gavril is confined to an asylum known as Arnskammar, in southern Tielen far from Azhkendir.  There he is experimented upon and pushed to the brink of death until, in desperation, he pleads for Khezef to return and save him.  Unbeknownst to Gavril, Kiukiu has undertaken the journey to Arnskammar in search of him, after Gavril escapes with the aid of Khezef, Kiukiu is misled by Eugene of Tielen’s trusted magus Kaspar Linnaius.

She is lured to the aid of Karila, Eugene’s sickly daughter, and while trying to heal the young princess she becomes trapped in a spirit realm by Nagar (also referred to as The Dread Prince Nagazdiel) who drains her, leaving her trapped inside her own ever-aging body.  Before she is trapped, however, she discovers the spirits of the first set of Drakhaouls’ children who were also imprisoned by Nagazdiel, and the spirits of these children have found their living counterparts.  The taxing strain of these spirits means that the living children are often sickly, much like Karila, who is Khezef’s child.

Throughout this book, Eugene and Linnaius work to discover the location of the Serpent Gate, a gate that will loose the four other Drakhaouls into the mortal realm.  Found on the island of Ty Nagar, the gate can only be opened by the reconstructed ruby of Artamon, which Eugene of Tielen had reunited to claim the title of Emperor of New Rossiya.  Hearing of this plan, Gavril tries to stop Eugene but arrives at Ty Nagar after Eugene has freed the Darkhouls and been possessed by Belberith.  The two fight, but as Gavril and Khezef have been weakened they are left for dead on the shores of Ty Nagar.  Eugene returns to his empire and the three other Drakhaouls seek out the descendants of Artamon.

Sahariel finds Oskar Alvborg, the illegitimate brother of Eugene, Adramelech finds Andrei Orlov, the brother of Astasia, Eugene’s newlywed wife, and Nilaihah seeks out the fervently religious Enguerrand of Francia under the guise of an angel.  Throughout Children of the Serpent Gate, these three men are driven by the desires of their Drakhaouls to kidnap the Drakhouls’ children and take them to Ty Nagar, where they would be sacrificed in order to free Nagazdiel and plunge the world into darkness.

Kiukiu and Malusha embark on a long journey to the Jade Springs in Khitari in order to give Kiukiu her youth back, and on their voyage they come into contact with the sickly Prince Bayar, another of the Drakhaouls’ children, and his father Khan Vachir of Khitari.  After successfully regaining her youth, Kiukiu is determined to help the Drakhaouls and send them from her world into their home in the Ways Beyond.

When discovering that both Karila, and the newborn Rostevan, have been kidnapped by other Drakhouls Eugene allies himself with Gavril in order to stop the plan to free Prince Nagar.  Although Za’afiel is freed, who is the Drakhaoul that must sacrifice the children in order to free Nagar, Eugene and Gavril manage to destroy the gate and prevent the summoning of Nagar.  Unfortunately, Karila is mortally wounded in the process, and as Eugene weeps for her and Kiukiu simultaneously (from Khitari) sings for the trapped spirits of the original Drakhaouls’ children to find their way to the Ways Beyond, a portal appears on Ty Nagar.  The Drakhaouls all peacefully leave their hosts and step through to the spirit world and are reunited with their children, as a parting gift Khezef heals Karila of her ailments and give her new life, sending her spirit back to her body and her grieving father.

At the end of Children of the Serpent Gate Eugene’s family is reunited, and he stipulates that should Oskar Alvborg return to New Rossiya he should be immediately detained in Arnskammer, also that Andrei Orlov is exiled from New Rossiya on pain of death.  Eugene awards Gavril with the title of High Steward of Azhkendir, who returns to his princedom and proposes marriage to Kiukiu.

The Seven Drakhaoulim, Hosts and Children

Drakhaouls and their Hosts

Khezef The Bringer Of Death– Gavril Nagarian: Khezef possesses Gavril's body supposedly after his father's death.

Adramelech  The Dreamer– Andrei Orlov: Adramelech seeks out Andrei one of the descendants of the sons of Artamon to use as a host to help the other Drakhaouls free Nagazdiel, his reason to get Andrei to use him is that Andrei should claim rightful rule of his kingdom (Muscobar) Andrei Orlov is also possessed by Khezef for a short time.

Belberith The Malchite Warrior – Eugene of Tielen/Emperor of New Rossiya: Eugene uses the tears of Artamon to open the Serpent gate and have a Drakhaoul possess him and as Belberith first exits the gate Eugene becomes the host of The Malachite warrior.

Sahariel The Spell-Binder– Oskar Alvborg:Sahariel shows Oskar his power by healing the wounds Khezef inflicted upon him, this convinces Oskar to take and use the Drakhaoul to claim New Rossiya as he finds out he is Eugene's illegitimate brother.

Nilaihah The Golden Tongued – Euguerrand King of Francia: Nilaihah Uses his 'Golden/Silver Tongue' to convince Eugerrand he is an Angel that will help him defeat the Drakhaouls.

Za’afiel Blower of Icy Winds – Khan Vachir

The Dread Prince Nagazdiel – he is intended to possess the baby Rostevan, but is not freed as The Tears of Artamon are ripped from the gate.

Drakhaouls' Children
Original children and their living counterparts:
Tilua – Karila
Koropanga – Bayar
Waiola – Aude
Mahina – Stavyomir
Kahukara – Giorgi

Novels
 The Lord of Snow and Shadows
 The Prisoner of the Iron Tower
 The Children of the Serpent Gate

In 2008, the first installment of the prequel series The Alchymist's Legacy was published, which is called Tracing the Shadow and is set primarily in Francia.

External links
Sarah Ash's website contains information on this series of books as well as other works by the author.  All of the books are available from the US and UK Amazon online shopping websites.

Fantasy novel series
Bantam Books books
Bantam Spectra books